Adiemus: Songs of Sanctuary is the first album by Welsh composer Karl Jenkins, recorded in 1994 and released the next year as part of the Adiemus project. The title track "Adiemus" was used first to the album's release in a 1994 Delta Air Lines television commercial (as well as related "Delta Air Lines" media around this time, including pre-departure videos aboard Delta flights).

Track listing
All tracks by Karl Jenkins

"Adiemus" – 4:01
"Tintinnabulum" – 10:57
"Cantus Inaequalis" – 3:13
"Cantus Insolitus" – 5:35
"In Caelum Fero" – 7:45
"Cantus Iteratus" – 6:36
"Amaté Adea" – 5:12
"Kayama" – 8:06
"Hymn" – 2:38

Personnel

Rina Cheung – Artwork
Kirsten Cowie – Assistant Engineer, Assistant
Jason Day – Project Coordinator
Douglas Brothers – Photography
Stephen Frost – Mastering, Mixing
Simon Heyworth – Mastering, Remastering
Helen Hodkinson – Executive Producer
Jody Barratt Jenkins – Percussion
Karl Jenkins – Conductor, Liner Notes, Orchestration
Phil Knott – Photography
Peter Mountain – Photography
Steve Price – Engineer, Mixing
Jenkins Ratledge – Producer
Frank Ricotti – Percussion
Michael Senn – Music Copyist
Mike Taylor – Quena, Soloist
Gary Thomas – Engineer
Robert St. John Wright – Conductor, Leader, Orchestra Leader 
London Philharmonic Orchestra
Miriam Stockley – Vocals
Mary Carewe – Additional Vocals
Pamela Thorby – Recorder
Mike Ratledge – Programmed Percussion

Singles and alternative versions
Common to albums in the Adiemus project, releases in different regions may have different cover art and may include additional tracks. The Japanese release of Songs of Sanctuary features a tenth track titled "Adiemus (Full Version)" which is a longer version of the first track "Adiemus". A limited edition release of Songs of Sanctuary features additional edited versions of "Tintinnabulum" and "Kayama".

An "Adiemus" CD single was released featuring an edited version of the track, a longer version, and a percussion rendition. "Kayama" was also released as a single with two versions of this piece as well as alternate arrangements of "Hymn" and "Adiemus". The "Adiemus Remix" CD single comprises four dance remixes of the song. Similarly, "Kayama Remix" features five dance remixes of the piece "Kayama". A final CD single release has two different length versions of "Tintinnabulum" along with the track "Cantus Iteratus".

"Cantus Insolitus" borrows its theme from the largo movement of Jenkins' Palladio, as heard on Diamond Music. Four instrumental variations on the title track "Adiemus" are also featured on Diamond Music.

A completely new remaster by Simon Heyworth was released on SACD in 2003 providing a considerable improvement in clarity to the entire work. This is the highest resolution release of any of the Adiemus releases to date and is the closest to an HD version of any Adiemus material.

The tracks "Kayama", "Hymn" and "Adiemus" are remastered on the 2006 Japanese only CD release Adiemus and Karl Kenkins - The Complete Best but still only to CD quality.

Certifications

}

References

External links
Stabat Mater national tour 2008 booking
Karl Jenkins

1995 classical albums
Adiemus 1
Choral compositions
1995 debut albums